The 1986 Green Bay Packers season was their 68th season overall and their 66th season in the National Football League. The team finished with a 4–12 record under coach Forrest Gregg, earning them 4th-place finish in the NFC Central division.

The Packers reached their nadir on the afternoon of November 23 at Soldier Field vs. their ancient archrivals, the Bears. After Mark Lee intercepted Jim McMahon in the second quarter, Green Bay defensive end Charles Martin picked up McMahon and slammed him shoulder-first into the artificial turf, causing a season-ending injury to the Chicago quarterback. Martin was ejected by referee Jerry Markbreit and suspended two games by Commissioner Pete Rozelle.

Offseason

NFL draft

Personnel

Staff

Roster

Regular season

Schedule

Standings

Statistics

Passing

Receiving

Awards and milestones

Hall of Fame Inductions
In 1986 Packer great Paul Hornung was inducted to the Pro Football Hall of Fame

The Following were inducted into the Green Bay Packers Hall of Fame in February 1986,

Lee Roy Caffey, LB, 1964–69

Irv Comp, B, 1943–49

References

Green Bay Packers seasons
Green Bay Packers
Green Bay